Map of places in West Lothian compiled from this list
See the list of places in Scotland for places in other counties.

This List of places in West Lothian is a list of links for any town, village, hamlet, castle, golf course, historic house, hillfort, lighthouse, nature reserve, reservoir, river, and other place of interest in the West Lothian council area of Scotland.

A
Abercorn
Abercorn Castle
Almondell and Calderwood Country Park
Almond Valley Heritage Centre, Almond Valley Railway Viaduct
Almond Aqueduct
Almondvale Stadium
Almondell Viaduct
Armadale
Auldcathie
Avon Viaduct

B
Balbardie Park of Peace Golf Course
Ballencrieff
Bangour Village Hospital
Bathgate
Bathgate Castle
Bathville
Beecraigs Country Park, Beecraigs Prehistoric Site, Beecraigs Sawmill
Bellsquarry
Bennie Museum, Bathgate
Binny Golf Club, Broxburn
Blackburn
Blackridge
Blawhorn Moss
Bowden Prehistoric Hillfort
Bridgend
Broxburn
Breich
Boghall

C
Cairnpapple Hill
Cairns Castle
Castle Greg
Castlethorn Prehistoric Hillfort
Cobbinshaw
Cobbinshaw Reservoir
Cockleroy Prehistoric Hillfort
Craigshill

D
Dechmont Law
Drumshoreland

E
East Calder
East Kirkton Quarry
East Whitburn
Ecclesmachan
Eliburn, Eliburn Reservoir, Eliburn Wood

F
Fauldhouse

G
Greenrigg

H
Harburn
Harperrig Reservoir
Hopetoun House
House of the Binns
Howden, Livingston

I
Illieston House

K
Kirk of Calder
Kirknewton
Kirkton, Livingston

L
Linlithgow, Linlithgow Marches, Linlithgow Palace, Linlithgow railway station
Livingston, Livingston railway station
Livingston Village
Longridge

M
Mid Calder
Midhope Castle
Morton
Murieston
Murieston Castle

N
Newton
Niddry Castle

O
Ochiltree Castle
Ogilface Castle

P
Peace Knowe Hillfort
Philpstoun
Polkemmet Country Park
Polkemmet Golf Club
Pumpherston

R
River Almond
River Avon
River Forth

S
Seafield
St Michael's Parish Church, Linlithgow
Strathbrock Church

T
Torphichen, Torphichen Preceptory
The Centre

U
Uphall

W
West Calder
Whitburn
Wilkieston
Winchburgh

See also
List of places in Scotland

External links
West Lothian Archaeology

West Lothian
Geography of West Lothian
Lists of places in Scotland
Populated places in Scotland